Borfor Carr (born June 12, 1987) is a Liberian footballer who is currently manager for Kalonji Soccer Academy ( KSA PRO-PROFILE ) in the United Premier Soccer League.

References

External links
Atlanta Silverbacks bio

1987 births
Living people
Liberian footballers
Liberian expatriate footballers
CS Concordia Chiajna players
Liga II players
Atlanta Silverbacks players
Expatriate footballers in Romania
Liberian expatriate sportspeople in Romania
Expatriate soccer players in the United States
North American Soccer League players
Georgia Revolution FC players
Association football midfielders